Alexandra Cordes (real name Ursula Horbach, née Schaake, 16 November 1935 – November 1986) was a prolific German writer of mainly romantic fiction, many of whose books were best-sellers.

Life 
Ursula Schaake was born in Bonn, Germany, of Huguenot descent. After finishing school she worked in the Bonn office of the Times newspaper. Afterwards she worked as a journalist for a number of German newspapers, including the "Welt" and the "Hamburger Abendblatt".

In 1958, she married Michael Horbach, a journalist and novelist, who encouraged her to write. She started by writing serials in women's magazines, which were later published in book form. The books sold well, so that by the time of her 59th book she had a turnover of 15 million books sold. This eclipsed the turnover of her husband, who had over four million books sold, over a much longer period.

In the 1970s, the childless couple moved to Châteauneuf-du-Pape in the Provence. On the night of 27 October 1986, Michael Horbach shot his wife in the head, killing her, with a revolver from his weapon collection. He shot himself a few hours later and died after a week in intensive care.

Select works 
 Drei Sterne sah ich leuchten, Munich 1983
 Einmal noch nach Hause, Munich 1983
 Liebe unter fremden Dächern, Munich 1983
 Die Nacht der Versuchung, Munich 1983
 Psychiater Dr. R. Treffpunkt Hansa-Hotel, Munich 1983
 Rechtsanwalt Dr. M., Munich 1983
 Spuren in der Wüste, Munich 1983
 Das Zauberkind, Munich 1983
 Hunde aus Porzellan, Munich 1984
 Das Jahr danach, München 1984
 Der Sehnsucht seltsame Wege, Munich 1984
 Traum von der ewigen Jugend, Munich 1984
 Das Traumschloß, Munich 1984
 Am Ende aller Flucht, Munich 1985
 Das dritte Leben, Munich 1985
 Lorna und das große Abenteuer, Munich 1985
 Der Mann aus der Fremde, Munich 1985
 Der Buschpilot, Munich 1986
 Der Hoteldetektiv, Munich 1986
 Die Lady, Munich 1986
 Eiko, Munich 1987

References

Sources
Erich Schaake: Lieben und Sterben in der Provence. Die Geschichte der Alexandra Cordes. Langen/Müller, 2005, .

1935 births
1986 deaths
Writers from Bonn
German women novelists
20th-century German women writers
Women romantic fiction writers
20th-century German novelists